Cameron Moulène (born 25 November 1993) is a French-American actor. He is well known for playing Will Armstrong on Happyland and Josh Bennett on the YouTube Red series Foursome.

Biography 
Moulène was born in Paris but moved to Los Angeles when he was two years old. He studied at the Lee Strasberg Theater and Film Institute and at the Royal Academy of Dramatic Art in London.

Career
When he was chosen to play Orlando in As You Like It in a school production, his interest in acting sparked. He appeared in recurring roles in television series such as Raising Hope, The Secret Life of the American Teenager and The Cleaner.

In 2014, Moulène was chosen to play Will Armstrong in the MTV comedy Happyland, which ran for a single season. Following the cancellation of the series, he joined Faking It, another MTV comedy.

He was a series regular in the YouTube Red series Foursome, starring as Josh Bennett from 2016 to 2018.

In 2020, he had a recurring role in the Hulu miniseries A Teacher.

Personal life
He speaks fluent French, English and Spanish, as well as broken Italian and Malagasy.

He has a son named August.

Filmography

Television

Film

References

External links 
 
 

1993 births
Living people
Male actors from Paris
French emigrants to the United States
American male television actors
American male film actors